Edmund Clau-Von Nelson (born April 30, 1960) is a former professional American football defensive lineman in the National Football League (NFL) for seven seasons for the Pittsburgh Steelers and New England Patriots.

Edmund served as the color analyst for Pittsburgh Steelers pre-season games and participated as a co-host to Bob Pompeani in KDKA-TV's regular season pre-game program Steelers Kickoff until retiring in 2015. He also owns an insurance agency located in the Pittsburgh area.

References

Living people
1960 births
People from Live Oak, Florida
Players of American football from Florida
American football defensive tackles
American football defensive ends
Auburn Tigers football players
Pittsburgh Steelers players
New England Patriots players
C. Leon King High School alumni